Retama monosperma, the bridal broom or bridal veil broom, is a flowering bush species in the genus Retama, native to the western Mediterranean Basin (from Portugal, Morocco and Canary Islands to Italy and Egypt).

Retama monosperma forms root nodules with Ensifer fredii. The larvae of the moths Phyllonorycter hesperiella and Phyllonorycter spartocytisi feed on R. monosperma.

The seeds contain cytisine, a toxic alkaloid. Fifteen other quinolizidine and three dipiperidine alkaloids can also be isolated from different parts of the plant. In particular, the presence of (+)-sparteine, α- and β-isosparteine, (+)-17-oxosparteine, (-)-lupanine, 5,6-dehydrolupanine, (-)-anagyrine, (-)-N-methylcytisine and (+)-ammodendrine can be detected.

References

External links

Genisteae
Plants described in 1753
Taxa named by Carl Linnaeus
Taxa named by Pierre Edmond Boissier